Alfred Pollard may refer to:

Alfred W. Pollard (1859–1944), English writer, bibliographer and painter
Al Pollard (Alfred Lee Pollard, 1928–2002), American football player
Alfred Oliver Pollard (1893–1960), English Army Officer, decorated World War I hero and author